The 1976 Lehigh Engineers football team was an American football team that represented Lehigh University as an independent during the 1976 NCAA Division II football season.

In their first year under head coach John Whitehead, the Engineers compiled a 6–5 record. John Healy and Marc Orcutt were the team captains.

After starting the season with three wins, the Engineers briefly appeared in the national Division II coaches poll rankings, at No. 6. A loss to Division I opponent Yale dropped them to No. 9. Following a loss the next week to Division II rival Bucknell, they fell out of the top 20. Lehigh remained unranked the rest of the year.

Lehigh played its home games at Taylor Stadium on the university campus in Bethlehem, Pennsylvania.

Schedule

References

Lehigh
Lehigh Mountain Hawks football seasons
Lehigh Engineers football